Seyed Sattar Seid (born 26 November 1987 in Tehran) is an Iranian cross-country skier who has competed since 2007. He finished 89th in the 15 km event at the 2010 Winter Olympics in Vancouver. Seid would later compete at the Winter Olympic in 2014 and 2018.

In January 2022, Seid was named to his fourth Olympic team.

Seid has six victories in lesser events up to 10 km since 2009.

References 

1987 births
Living people
Iranian male cross-country skiers
Cross-country skiers at the 2010 Winter Olympics
Cross-country skiers at the 2014 Winter Olympics
Cross-country skiers at the 2018 Winter Olympics
Olympic cross-country skiers of Iran
Sportspeople from Tehran
Asian Games silver medalists for Iran
Asian Games medalists in ski orienteering
Ski-orienteers at the 2011 Asian Winter Games
Cross-country skiers at the 2007 Asian Winter Games
Cross-country skiers at the 2011 Asian Winter Games
Medalists at the 2011 Asian Winter Games